The Mixtape About Nothing is the fourth mixtape by American rapper Wale, released on May 30, 2008. It was mixed by Nick Catchdubs in collaboration with New York streetwear brand 10.Deep Clothing as a free download.

Theme 
Wale was inspired by the show Seinfeld. Wale claims he has "seen every episode". The mixtape samples extensively from Seinfeld, and Wale peppers his raps with frequent reference to jokes and catch phrases from the series. Each track follows the series' naming conventions for episodes, formatting each title with the definitive article "The." In the track "The Kramer," Wale raps about use of the word "nigger," referring to the Michael Richards Laugh Factory incident, which Wale also attacks across the rest of the mixtape.  Actress Julia Louis-Dreyfus, who plays the character Elaine Benes in Seinfeld, appears on the mixtape. In 2015, Wale collaborated with Jerry Seinfeld on an album called The Album About Nothing.

Critical reception 

Upon its release, The Mixtape About Nothing has received favorable reviews from music critics. Arthur Gailes of RapReviews.com gave the album an 8.5 out of 10.

Track listing 
From "The Mixtape About Nothing".

References 

2008 mixtape albums
Wale (rapper) albums